Davis Aydelotte Robertson (September 25, 1889 – November 5, 1970) was an American professional baseball player. He was an outfielder over parts of nine seasons with the New York Giants, Chicago Cubs, and Pittsburgh Pirates.

Robertson was born in Portsmouth, Virginia. He attended North Carolina State University after matriculating at Maury High School and Norfolk Academy. 

In 1916 and 1917, he tied for the National League lead in home runs (with Cy Williams and Gavvy Cravath, respectively) while playing for New York. The short-distanced right field fence at the Polo Grounds was a frequent target of long drives hit by Robertson and his Giants' teammate, Benny Kauff. Their hits to right field became so much of an issue that  National League officials convened  following  the 1916 baseball season. Baseball officials decided to amend Rule #1, which read the shortest distance from a fence or stand on fair territory to the home base should be 235 feet. The amendment to the rule changed the shortest distance from a stand or fence to 270 feet.

Robertson played for the Giants in the 1917 World Series against the Chicago White Sox, his 11 hits leading the team in the Series in a losing cause. A member of the Giants during the 1922 season, he did not make an appearance in the 1922 World Series. The champion Giants swept all four games of that Series from their crosstown rival New York Yankees.

In a nine-year major-league career, Robertson posted a .287 batting average (812-2830) with 366 runs, 47 home runs and 364 RBI in 804 games played. His on-base percentage was .318 and slugging percentage was .409. He surpassed the .300 batting mark three times. On September 14, 1920, he went 5-5 as a member of the Cubs. On August 19, 1921, he had 8 RBI in a game as a member of the Pirates. Eleven days later, on August 30, he hit for the cycle.

Robertson died at the age of 81 in Virginia Beach, Virginia.

See also
 List of Major League Baseball players to hit for the cycle
 List of Major League Baseball annual home run leaders

References

External links

, or Retrosheet

National League home run champions
1889 births
1970 deaths
Major League Baseball outfielders
Baseball players from Virginia
New York Giants (NL) players
Chicago Cubs players
Pittsburgh Pirates players
Major League Baseball right fielders
Major League Baseball left fielders
NC State Wolfpack baseball players
Minor league baseball managers
Mobile Sea Gulls players
Richmond Colts players
Norfolk Tars players
York White Roses players
Sportspeople from Portsmouth, Virginia